Foshan University (FOSU) is a designated full-time comprehensive university in Foshan, Guangdong province, China.

History
The university is a merger between its predecessor and Foshan Agriculture & Animal Husbandry College approved by the Chinese Education Ministry. It came under the administration of the Guangdong provincial government and Foshan local government in 1995.

In 2002, Foshan University was accredited with the national teaching assessment for bachelor's degree program.

Administration
The university comprises the following schools: Literature and Art School, Law and Politics School, Science School, Mechatronics and Information Engineering School, Environment and Civil Engineering School, Life Science School, Business School, Medical School, Education Science School, Faculty of Physical Education.

The university has been developing into a well-structured, multidisciplinary university with a full set of specialties.

References

External links

Official website 
Official website 
China Medical University
Official English Site

Educational institutions established in 1995
Universities and colleges in Guangdong
Buildings and structures in Foshan
1995 establishments in China